The 1991–92 Segunda Divisão de Honra season was the second season of the competition and the 58th season of recognised second-tier football in Portugal.

Overview
The league was contested by 18 teams with SC Espinho winning the championship and gaining promotion to the Primeira Divisão along with Os Belenenses and FC Tirsense. At the other end of the table Académico Viseu, Portimonense SC and SC Olhanense were relegated to the Segunda Divisão.

League standings

Footnotes

External links
 Portugal 1991/92 - RSSSF (Paulo Claro)
 Portuguese II Liga 1991/1992 - footballzz.co.uk

Portuguese Second Division seasons
Port
2